The Battle of the Milvian Bridge,  The Battle of the Bridge or The Battle Between the Emperors Maxentius and Constantine is a 1655 oil on canvas painting by Claude Lorrain, now in the Pushkin Museum in Moscow. Despite the title (referring to the Battle of the Milvian Bridge), according to E. B. Sharnova, the painting has no historical specificity.

References

1655 paintings
Paintings in the collection of the Pushkin Museum
Paintings by Claude Lorrain
Bridges in art